Politics & Gender is a political science journal that publishes scholarship on gender and politics and on women and politics. It aims to represent the full range of questions, issues, and approaches on gender and women across the major subfields of political science, including comparative politics, international relations, political theory, and U.S. politics. It seeks to publish studies that address fundamental questions in politics and political science from the perspective of gender difference, as well as those that interrogate and challenge standard analytical categories and conventional methodologies. The journal is edited by Susan Franceschet and Christina Wolbrecht and its book reviews are edited by Meryl Kenney.

Abstracting and indexing 

According to the Journal Citation Reports, the journal has a 2018 impact factor of .779, ranking it 29 out of 44 journals in the category "Women's Studies" and 136 out of 176 journals in the category "Political Science".

See also 
 List of political science journals
 List of women's studies journals

References 

Cambridge University Press academic journals
English-language journals
Publications established in 2005
Quarterly journals
Women's studies journals